Maryam bint Ibrahim al-’Attar (1467 – 1493) also known as Morayma was the last sultana of Granada as the spouse of Muhammad XII of Granada. She has been used as an inspiration by many authors and often portrayed within fiction.

Biography 
She was the daughter of Ali Athar, M. de Xagra, Granada's governor in Loja and a court functionary. 

Morayma is described as beautiful and religious. Her wedding took place in 1482. Shortly thereafter, she and her husband were imprisoned by her father-in-law. They were liberated by Kingdom of Castile in 1483, but their children were kept as hostages. She did not see her children until after the fall of Granada in 1492.

Morayma followed her spouse in exile to Andarax Laujar but died shortly before they could leave for Fes in 1493.

Issue 
 Aixa, later known as Sister Isabel de Granada.
 Ahmed
 Yusef

References

Nasrid dynasty
15th-century people from al-Andalus
People of the Reconquista
1467 births
1493 deaths
Women of the Emirate of Granada
15th-century Arabs
Spouses of sultans